Amorbia rectangularis is a species of moth of the family Tortricidae. It is found from southern Brazil to Guatemala, where it is found at altitudes between 50 and 1,670 meters.

The length of the forewings is 6.5–8 mm for males and 9.5–12 mm for females. The ground colour of the forewings is pale yellow with brownish marks in the median and postmedian area near the costa. The hindwings have a dark apical area, bordering a translucent patch. There seem to be multiple generations per year.

References

Moths described in 1931
Sparganothini
Moths of Central America
Moths of South America